James Greechan (1883 – 25 August 1917) was a Scottish professional football inside left who played in the Football League for Clapton Orient, Glossop and Stockport County.

Personal life 
Greechan served as a private in the 12th (Service) Battalion of the Highland Light Infantry during the First World War and died of wounds suffered at the Battle of Langemarck on 25 August 1917. He was buried in Lijssenthoek Military Cemetery.

Career statistics

References

Scottish footballers
Brentford F.C. players
English Football League players
Association football inside forwards
Petershill F.C. players
Hibernian F.C. players
Southern Football League players
1883 births
Footballers from Glasgow
Bo'ness F.C. players
Leyton Orient F.C. players
Glossop North End A.F.C. players
Stockport County F.C. players
Scottish Football League players
Albion Rovers F.C. players
Carlisle United F.C. players
Bathgate F.C. players
British Army personnel of World War I
British military personnel killed in World War I
Highland Light Infantry soldiers
1917 deaths
Burials at Lijssenthoek Military Cemetery